The Last Days of Gravity is Younger Brother's second album. It is a collaborative downtempo psychedelic project between English psytrance Producers Simon Posford (Hallucinogen, Shpongle) and Benji Vaughan (Prometheus, Cyberbabas).

The album was positively received by critics.

Track listing 
"Happy Pills" - 8:49
"All I Want" - 9:06
"Elephant Machine" - 6:22
"Your Friends Are Scary" - 6:41
"I Am a Freak" - 9:00
"Ribbon on a Branch" - 7:49
"Sleepwalker, Part 1" - 6:18
"Sleepwalker, Part 2" - 6:02
"Psychic Gibbon" - 7:31

Trivia 
 The cover art of The Last Days Of Gravity is done by Storm Thorgerson.
 The spoken intro in "All I Want" is taken from an interview with Salvador Dalí.
 The female singing at 4:44 in "All I Want" is taken from the song "Viimesen Kerran / The Very Last Time" by the Finnish quartet Loituma.

References

External links
The Last Days Of Gravity at twisted.co.uk - Features samples of Younger Brother's second album.
Younger Brother MySpace
Homepage of Storm Thorgerson

2007 albums
Younger Brother albums
Albums produced by Benji Vaughan
Albums with cover art by Storm Thorgerson